Ecosa Group is an Australian bed-in-a-box company specializing in mattresses.

History
Ecosa was founded in 2015 in Melbourne by Ringo Chan. The team studied various foams for R&D purposes before starting off with production.

Ecosa Group expanded into New Zealand in May 2016 and to Hong Kong in September the same year. By December 2017, the company had landed in its fourth location, the United States. The company has also entered the Canadian market in 2019.

In January 2018, the company also started producing Ecosa pillow that included a contour and adjustable height. By November previous year, they had reached $30 million in sales.

Ecosa was cited for donating around 500 mattresses to The Salvation Army.

The company has been featured in mainstream media sources like news.com.au and The New Zealand Herald among others.

Controversy
The company came into limelight when it conflicted with Koala Mattress manufacturer which accused Ecosa of stealing their idea that involved testing the flexibility and shape memory of a mattress by putting a wine glass on the mattress and jumping on it. The fact that wine glass wouldn't tip or even move would then become an argument for the mattress quality. Both companies had released their own versions of similar videos. However, Ecosa founder reacted by saying that they had developed that test before them pointing out that others had also tried "water glass" test before them both and therefore such ideas were not intellectual property. Ecosa's wine glass test video had 3.04 million views as of March 2016. The two founders have also presented counter arguments over the type of "zero disturbance" mattresses they create. Chan remarked that Koala had not invented the K-4 foams.

References

External links
Official website

Retail companies established in 2015
Companies based in Melbourne
Online retailers of Australia